Sharon Danville (née Colyear, born 22 April 1955) is a British former sprinter and hurdler. She represented Great Britain at the 1976 Montreal Olympics and at the 1984 Los Angeles Olympics. She won a bronze medal in the 100 metres hurdles at the 1978 Commonwealth Games, while in the 4 x 100 metres relay, she won a gold medal at the 1978 Commonwealth Games and a silver medal at the 1978 European Championships.

Career
Born in Manchester, England, Colyear won the 1969 AAAs Under 15 200m title in 25.5 secs and the 1970 AAAs U17 200m title in 25.0 secs.

On 22 June 1976, Colyear achieved her lifetime best in the 100m hurdles with 13.11 secs in Poland. She then won the AAAs 100m hurdles title, ahead of Judy Vernon, running a wind-assisted 13.47 secs, and also finished second behind Andrea Lynch in the 100m, running 11.39. At the 1976 Montreal Olympics, she ran 13.18 in her heat to qualify for the 100m hurdles semifinals, where she was eliminated in 17.32. She also finished second to Sonia Lannaman in the AAAs 100m final in 1977,  running 11.35.
 
Colyear won her second AAAs 100m hurdles title in 1978, running 13.51 to defeat Shirley Strong, who was second. At the 1978 Commonwealth Games in Edmonton, she won a bronze medal in an English sweep of the 100m hurdles final, with a wind-assisted 13.17, finishing behind Lorna Boothe (12.98) and Shirley Strong (13.08). She did win a gold medal in the relay, along with teammates  Bev Goddard, Kathy Smallwood and Sonia Lannaman. A month later at  the 1978 European Championships, she won a silver medal for Great Britain in the relay with the same three teammates. In the 100m hurdles, she ran 13.23 secs in her heat to qualify for the semis, where she ran 13.25, missing the final by one place.

After several quiet seasons and now competing as Sharon Danville, she ran 13.66 to finish third in the 100m hurdles at the 1983 UK Championships behind Shirley Strong and Pat Rollo. She earned selection for the Los Angeles Olympics in 1984, where she ran 13.46 in her 100m hurdles heat to qualify for the semifinals, where she improved to 13.35 for fifth in the second semi, missing the final by one place.

International competitions

References

1955 births
Living people
English female hurdlers
English female sprinters
Olympic athletes of Great Britain
Athletes (track and field) at the 1976 Summer Olympics
Athletes (track and field) at the 1978 Commonwealth Games
Athletes (track and field) at the 1984 Summer Olympics
Commonwealth Games medallists in athletics
Commonwealth Games gold medallists for England
Commonwealth Games bronze medallists for England
Medallists at the 1978 Commonwealth Games